Satipo Airport  is an airstrip adjacent to the town of Satipo in the Junín Region of Peru. The runway parallels highway 24A as it enters the southwestern edge of town. The location is in the valley of the Satipo River, with nearby mountainous terrain to the north and south.

Google Earth Historical Imagery dated December 1969 shows a  runway.

See also

Transport in Peru
List of airports in Peru

References

External links
OpenStreetMap - Satipo

Airports in Peru
Buildings and structures in Junín Region